Llapushnik is a village in municipality Glogovac in Kosovo.

Geography

Demography

History 
The village became notorious after 1998 because of the Lapušnik prison camp operated by the Albanian militant organization the UÇK. It also had a famous battle with the KLA and Yugoslav forces, which led to an KLA victory in 1998 known as the Battle of Llapushnik

Notes

References 

Villages in Drenas